(1926–1997) was a Japanese kiri-e (papercutting) artist.  In 1995 he was selected as the year's official artist for the United Nations.  He created illustrations for modern publications of Japanese classic literature, including Oku no Hosomichi, The Tale of Genji, and The Tale of the Bamboo Cutter.

His most prominent work, Red Fuji, was produced and sold in 184 countries worldwide.  Selections of his work are still published today by Kodansha International.

External links
 Biography and gallery

References

Japanese artists
1997 deaths
1926 births